Capitol Square is a  skyscraper on Capitol Square in Downtown Columbus, Ohio. The building was designed by the architectural firm Abramovitz, Harris & Kingsland and it follows the international and modern architectural styles. Capitol Square is the 13th tallest building in Columbus.

The 20-floor Sheraton Columbus Hotel at Capitol Square is part of the same complex, and is constructed on the former site of the Hartman Building.

The statue Naiads is situated in a courtyard between Capitol Square and the Sheraton hotel. West of Capitol Square is a courtyard created in 1984 between the building and the Ohio Theatre, including the Galbreath Pavilion.

Gallery

See also
List of tallest buildings in Columbus, Ohio

References

External links

Emporis
Skyscraperpage

Buildings in downtown Columbus, Ohio
Office buildings completed in 1984
Skyscraper office buildings in Columbus, Ohio